Jeffrey Milton Walker (born 11 September 1960) is a former Australian cricketer. He was a right-handed batsman. He played 2 first-class cricket matches for Queensland between 1988 and 1989, scoring 87 runs.

References

External links
 

1960 births
Australian cricketers
Queensland cricketers
Sportsmen from Queensland
Living people
20th-century Australian people